Atractylis cancellata is a species of annual herb in the family Asteraceae. They have a self-supporting growth form and simple, broad leaves and dry fruit.

Sources

References 

Flora of Malta
Cynareae